The  is an electric multiple unit (EMU) train type operated on the Tokyo Metro Tozai Line and Tokyo Metro Chiyoda Line Ayase Branch in Japan by the subway operator Tokyo Metro. Some sets have also been shipped to Indonesia, where they operate on the KRL Commuterline system in Jakarta.

A total of 43 ten-car trainsets were built from 1988 to 2004, with a number of variants. Sets 05-125 onward have a redesigned front end, and are called "05N series". Sets  to 05-118 have wide doors. A further four sets were due to be built, but the plan was changed to use 07 series trains transferred from the Yurakucho Line, so no further 05 series trains were built.

Operations
, a total of 34 sets (30 x ten-car sets and 4 x three-car sets) were in operation in Japan.

Tozai Line 10-car sets
30 x ten-car sets based at Fukagawa Depot and used on the following lines.
 Tokyo Metro Tozai Line
 Tōyō Rapid Line between Nishi-Funabashi Station, Tōyō-Katsutadai Station and Nakano Station.
 JR Chūō-Sōbu Line between Nakano Station and Mitaka Station.
 JR Chūō-Sōbu Line between Nishi-Funabashi Station and Tsudanuma Station (only weekday mornings and evenings).

Chiyoda Line 3-car sets
Four three-car sets based at Ayase Depot for use on Chiyoda Line Kita-Ayase Branch Line services since 2014.

Specifications

 Note: Sets  to 139 use 3 pantographs (other pantographs are not used).

Batch differences
  to 05-113
 Built 1988 to 1991.
 From front end glass is slightly extended.
 05-114
 Built 1991.
 Wide-door cars.
 VVVF prototype cars.
  to 05-118
 Built 1992.
 Wide-door cars.
  to 05-124
 Built 1993 to 1994.
 Control system is similar to 06 series and 07 series.
 Window sizes are not uniform.
 Set 05-124 contains recycled aluminium components.
  to 05-133
 Built 1999 to 2001.
 Design is completely changed.(05N)
 Performance is similar to sets 119 to 124.
 05–134 to 05-139
 Built 2002 to 2003.
 Control system is similar to 08 series (used on Hanzōmon Line), with increased performance.
 Uniform window size
  to 05-143 (13th batch)
 Built 2004.
 Control system is similar to sets 134 to 139, but uses pure electric braking.
 Body fabrication changed to adopt Hitachi A-Train concept.

Formations

Refurbished sets
The refurbished sets are formed as shown below, with four motored "M" cars, and with car 1 at the Nishi-Funabashi end.

Each motored car (cars 2, 4, 7, and 9) is fitted with one single-arm pantograph.

Chiyoda Line Kita-Ayase Branch 3-car sets

The four sets refurbished and reformed as three-car units for use on the Chiyoda Line Kita-Ayase Branch from April 2014 are formed as shown below, with two motored ("M") cars and one non-powered trailer ("T") car, and with car 1 at the Ayase end. Sets , 05-106 and 05-113 have been moved to the Chiyoda line.

 The "M1" car has two lozenge-type pantographs.
 The two motored cars each have three axles motored.

Interior

Refurbishment
In December 2012, set 05-114 underwent "type B" refurbishment, with a number of improvements utilizing features on the newer 15000 series sets. The traction motors were replaced with new PMSM (permanent magnet synchronous motors), as used on the Chiyoda Line 16000 series sets, and internally, 17-inch LCD passenger information screens were added above the doorways.

Retirement
The 05 series begun to be replaced by new 15000 series trains from May 2010. The first batch was replaced by the 15000 series, and has since been scrapped.

Eight former 05 series sets have been shipped to KAI Commuter (formerly known as KA Commuter Jabodetabek / KRL Jabodetabek) in Jakarta, Indonesia. These sets have been reduced to eight cars.

Set 05-107 was withdrawn following derailment accident damage sustained in October 2012.
Set 05-105,109 and 112 is no longer in operation and stored in Depok railway depot.

Gallery

See also
 Tōyō Rapid 2000 series, trains built to the same design (05N Version)

References

External links

 Tokyo Metro Tozai Line 05 series information 
 Tokyo Metro Tozai Line New 05 series information 

Electric multiple units of Japan
05 series
Train-related introductions in 1988
Electric multiple units of Indonesia
Kinki Sharyo multiple units
Hitachi multiple units
1500 V DC multiple units of Japan
Kawasaki multiple units
Nippon Sharyo multiple units
Tokyu Car multiple units